Teesdalia is a genus in the plant family Brassicaceae. They are herbaceous plants native mostly to Europe and to the Mediterranean region. Shepherdscress is a common name for these plants.

Species
Only two species are currently accepted by The Plant List, although a few others have "unresolved" status:

Teesdalia coronopifolia (J.P.Bergeret) Thell. 	
Teesdalia nudicaulis (L.) W.T.Aiton

References

Brassicaceae
Brassicaceae genera